Abilene Airport may refer to:

 Abilene Municipal Airport in Abilene, Kansas, United States (FAA: K78)
 Abilene Regional Airport in Abilene, Texas, United States (FAA: ABI)